IRRC may stand for:
 Independent Regulatory Review Commission
 International Road Racing Championship
 Irrigated Rice Research Consortium
 immune-related Response Criteria